Joaherul Islam is a Bangladesh Awami League politician and the incumbent Member of Parliament from Tangail-8.

Career
Islam was elected to Parliament on 30 December 2018 from Tangail-8 as a Bangladesh Awami League candidate.

References

Awami League politicians
Living people
11th Jatiya Sangsad members
Year of birth missing (living people)